The 1963 Monegasque municipal elections were held on 10 March to elect the 15 members of the Communal Council of Monaco.

Electoral system
The 15 councillors were elected for a four-year period in a single multi-member constituency using plurality-at-large voting with a two-round system. A majority of the votes was required to be elected. The second round would have been held one week after the first round.
The Mayor of Monaco was elected by the councillors after the election.

Results

Summary 

Following the election, Robert Boisson was reelected mayor.

Full results

References

1963
Monaco
Municipal election
March 1963 events in Europe